This is a list of hospitals in the U.S. state of New York.  The hospitals are  listed by the most recent hospital name with the name of the health system, county, city, date the hospital first opened, and most recent number of beds, when known.  For defunct hospitals, the closing date is included, when known.  Military hospitals and psychiatric hospitals are listed separately.  More detailed descriptions are in the lists of hospitals in New York City's five boroughs and separate articles for many notable hospitals.

The American Hospital Directory lists 261 active hospitals in New York State in 2022.  Two hundred and ten of these hospitals have staffed-beds with a total of 64,515 beds.  The largest number of hospitals are in New York City.  The January 1, 2022 listing by the New York Health Department of general hospitals covered by the New York Healthcare Reform Act show 165 hospitals 63 closed hospitals, and 51 hospitals that had been merged with other hospitals.

The oldest hospital in New York State and also oldest hospital in the United States is the Bellevue Hospital in Manhattan, established in 1736.  The hospital with the largest number of staffed beds is the NewYork-Presbyterian Hospital in Manhattan with 2,678 beds in its hospital complex.

Hospitals 

The notable hospitals in New York are listed below using the current name of the hospital and previous names described in footnotes.   This list is sortable by name, county, city, date opened and number of beds.  The range of number of beds in hospitals goes from the multi-campus NewYork-Presbyterian Hospital in Manhattan with 2,678 beds to Mercy Hospital in Orchard Park with only two beds.  The number of beds for each hospital since the beginning of the COVID-19 pandemic has fluctuated, so references are included.

Defunct hospitals 

The following general hospitals in New York are defunct.  Defunct VA and psychiatric hospitals are listed in separate sections of this article.

Military hospitals 

As of 2022, there were 11  United States Department of Veterans Affairs hospitals in New York, and one VA hospital that closed in 1950.

Military hospitals

Psychiatric hospitals 
As of 2022, there were 97 operating hospitals in New York that have psychiatric beds.  The New York hospitals listed in the table below are or were used solely for psychiatric patients.  Defunct hospitals names are in italics.  County, city, coordinates, date the hospital opened, number of beds in most recent data, and references are given for each hospital.  When Pilgrim State Hospital (Pilgrim Psychiatric Center) opened in 1931 it was the largest psychiatric hospital in the United States. At its peak, it had 14,000 patients.  In 2018, there was a total of 11,109 adult in-patient psychiatric beds in New York state and New York City hospitals, including 7,228 beds in general hospitals.

Notes on hospitals

Gallery of hospitals

Health systems in New York State 

 Albany Med, based in Albany
 Bassett Healthcare Network
 Catholic Health, Buffalo (Trinity Health)
 Catholic Health, formerly Catholic Health Services of Long Island
 Cayuga Health System, based in the Finger Lakes Region
 Finger Lakes Health, based in Geneva
 MediSys Health Network, based in Queens
 Mohawk Valley Health System
 Montefiore Health System, based in the Bronx: Hospitals in the Bronx, Westchester and Rockland Counties
 Mount Sinai Health System, based in Manhattan: Hospitals in Manhattan, Brooklyn, and Queens
 NewYork-Presbyterian Healthcare System (NYPHS), based in Manhattan: Hospitals in Manhattan, Queens, Bronx, Brooklyn, Westchester County
 Northwell Health, based in Nassau County, hospitals in Manhattan, Nassau, Queens, Staten Island, Suffolk Counties
 Nuvance Health (includes former Health Quest System), based in Mid-Hudson Valley
 NYC Health + Hospitals, operates the NYC public hospitals and clinics as a public benefit corporation
 Oswego Health System, based in Oswego
 Rochester Regional Health System, based in Rochester
 St. Joseph's Health (Syracuse, New York) (Trinity Health), based in Syracuse
 St. Lawrence Health System
 St. Peter's Health Partners (SPHP) (Trinity Health), based in Troy
 Stony Brook Medicine, based in Stony Brook
 UR Medicine Health System, Rochester, New York, based in Rochester
 Westchester Medical Center Health Network (WMCHealth), also known officially as  the Westchester County Healthcare Corporation.  WMCHealth hospitals are in the lower and mid-Hudson Valley. This network includes three former Bon Secours Charity Health System hospitals.

See also 

 List of hospitals in the Bronx
 List of hospitals in Brooklyn
 List of hospitals in Manhattan
 List of hospitals in Queens
 List of hospitals on Staten Island

Notes

References

Bibliography 
 
 
 
 
 
 
 
 
 
 
 
 

 
 
 
New York
Hospitals